"Yassassin" (Bowie's pronunciation ; also known as "Yassassin (Turkish for: Long Live)", and released in Turkey as "Yassassin (Yaşasın)") is a song written by English singer-songwriter David Bowie for the 1979 album Lodger. "Yassassin" is an incongruous reggae song with a Turkish flavour.

The title of the song is derived from the Turkish verb used to wish someone a long life, spelled yaşasın, from the verbal root yaşa- 'live' with the third-person imperative ending; therefore yaşasın literally means 'may he/she live'.

"Yassassin" was released as a single – the third single to be released from Lodger – but only in the Netherlands and Turkey.  The Dutch single edit of the song was included on Re:Call 3, part of the A New Career in a New Town (1977–1982) compilation (2017).

Track listing

RCA PB-9417 (Netherlands)
 "Yassassin" (David Bowie) – 3:06
 "Repetition" (Bowie) – 2:58

RCA 79.014 (Turkey)
 "Yassassin" (Bowie)
 "Red Money" (Bowie, Carlos Alomar)

Personnel
According to Chris O'Leary:
 David Bowie – lead and background vocals, synthesiser
 Carlos Alomar – rhythm guitar, background vocals
 Tony Visconti – acoustic guitar, background vocals
 George Murray – bass, background vocals
 Simon House – violin, background vocals
 Dennis Davis – drums, tambourine, background vocals

Technical
 David Bowie – producer
 Tony Visconti – producer

Cover versions
 The song was covered by new wave band Litfiba in 1994.
 American indie rock band Shearwater performed a version of the song in May 2016 for The A.V. Club A.V. Undercover series, and again as part of a live performance of the entire Berlin Trilogy for WNYC in 2018

References

Sources

David Bowie songs
1979 songs
Songs written by David Bowie
Song recordings produced by David Bowie
Song recordings produced by Tony Visconti
RCA Records singles
Reggae songs